Hindupur railway station (station code:HUP) is a main railway station in Anantapur district, Andhra Pradesh. Its code is HUP. It serves Hindupur city. The station consists of four platforms. The platforms are not well sheltered. It lacks many facilities including water and sanitation. The station is administered under Bangalore division of South Western Railway zone.

References 

Railway junction stations in India
Railway stations in Anantapur district
Bangalore railway division